Nahuel Jonathan Rodríguez González (born 18 March 1996) is an Argentine professional footballer who plays as a midfielder.

Career
Rodríguez's first senior career club was Argentinos Juniors, who he started appearing for during the 2015 Argentine Primera División season. Manager Néstor Gorosito picked Rodríguez three times that campaign, which included his professional bow during a 1–0 defeat to Racing Club on 26 September. In May 2017, Estudiantes of Primera B Metropolitana signed Rodríguez on loan. He remained until the end of 2017, featuring in both 2016–17 and 2017–18. Soon after returning to Argentinos Juniors, Rodríguez was loaned out again as he joined Paraguayan Primera División side Deportivo Capiatá.

Career statistics
.

References

External links

1996 births
Living people
People from Tres de Febrero Partido
Argentine footballers
Association football midfielders
Argentine expatriate footballers
Expatriate footballers in Paraguay
Argentine expatriate sportspeople in Paraguay
Argentine Primera División players
Primera B Metropolitana players
Paraguayan Primera División players
Argentinos Juniors footballers
Estudiantes de Buenos Aires footballers
Deportivo Capiatá players
Club Atlético Brown footballers
Nueva Chicago footballers
Flandria footballers
Sportspeople from Buenos Aires Province